Alexander Simpson (June 12, 1872 – July 20, 1953) was an American journalist, attorney, and  Democratic politician. He served in both houses of the New Jersey Legislature and as Assistant Attorney General of New Jersey.

Biography
Simpson was born in 1872 in Jersey City, New Jersey. He graduated from Jersey City High School (now William L. Dickinson High School) and attended Columbia Law School but could not afford to complete his studies there. He worked for a judge in the court  and took a second job as a reporter, working for the New York Recorder and then for the New York World and New York Globe. 
 
Simpson started his political career as an election officer in Jersey City's First Ward.  He was a member of the New Jersey General Assembly for three terms (1898, 1916, 1918); member of New Jersey state senate from Hudson County, 1920–30. In 1930, he was the Democratic candidate for United States Senate in the regularly scheduled election, unsuccessfully opposing Republican nominee Dwight Morrow.

In his position as Assistant Attorney General, Simpson achieved fame as the prosecuting attorney in the Hall-Mills Murder trial. After investigating the 1922 murder of Edward Wheeler Hall, a New Brunswick Episcopal priest, and Eleanor Reinhardt Mills, a member of Hall's choir, Simpson was assigned as a special prosecutor in 1926 in the state's case against the priest's wife and her brothers. The three defendants were never convicted and the case remained unsolved.

Simpson died in 1953 at Jersey City Medical Center at the age of 81.

References

External links
Biographical information for Alexander Simpson from The Political Graveyard

1872 births
1953 deaths
Politicians from Jersey City, New Jersey
William L. Dickinson High School alumni
Columbia Law School alumni
New Jersey lawyers
Democratic Party members of the New Jersey General Assembly
Democratic Party New Jersey state senators